Tobias Wilner is a Danish composer, musician, record producer, photographer and film director. 
He's best known as bandleader and lead vocalist from the band Blue Foundation and his film score for the Danish financial crime thriller Follow The Money.
He is a member and producer of the bands Blue Foundation, Tachys, Ghost Society, Bichi and New York United.

He has performed and recorded with Mark Kozelek, Erika Spring (Au Revoir Simone), Jonas Bjerre, Daniel Carter, Federico Ughi, DJ Krush, Mew, Sara Savery, Sonya Kitchell, Findlay Brown, Apparatjik, and others.

His music has been featured in films like Twilight, Miami Vice and on TV shows like CSI: Miami and The Vampire Diaries.

He works as a film composer, record producer, songwriter and performing artist.

He has directed music videos for Ravages, Drop The Gun, Sara Savery and Blue Foundation.

Discography

Albums 
 2000: Wise Guy – Blue Foundation, April Records
 2001: Blue Foundation – Blue Foundation, April Records
 2004: Sweep of Days – Blue Foundation, EMI
 2006: Solid Origami – Blue Foundation, Popgroup
 2006: Dead People's Choice – Blue Foundation, EMI
 2007: Life of a Ghost – Blue Foundation, Astralwerks
 2009: Notwithstanding – Bichi, Hobby Industries
 2010: Tankograd Original Soundtrack – Tobias Wilner, Dead People's Choice Records
 2012: In My Mind I Am Free – Blue Foundation, Dead People's Choice Records
 2013: In My Mind I Am Free Reconstructed – Blue Foundation, Dead People's Choice Records
 2016: Bedrag Original Soundtrack – Tobias Wilner, Dead People's Choice Records
 2016: Slow Light – Findlay Brown, Nettwerk
 2016: Blood Moon – Blue Foundation, Dead People's Choice Records
 2018: New York United – New York United, 577 Records
 2019: Human Shelter Original Score – Tobias Wilner, KØИ Records
 2019: Silent Dream – Blue Foundation, KØИ Records
 2019: New York United Vol. 2 – New York United, 577 Records

EP's 
 2008: Erobreren – Bichi, Cactus Island Records
 2010: Dogs and Desperation – Ghost Society, Minty Fresh
 2015: Live in Zhangbei – Blue Foundation, Dead People's Choice Records
 2016: Eyes On Fire Re-worked – Blue Foundation, Dead People's Choice Records
 2016: It Begins – Blue Foundation, Dead People's Choice Records

As sideman 
 1997: A Triumph For Man – Mew, Evil Office
 2003: Frengers – Mew, Epic Records
 2004: Jaku – DJ Krush, Sony Music 
 2013: Lost – Trentemøller, In My Room

Soundtracks 
 2005: The O.C. (TV Series)
 2005: Drabet
 2006: Miami Vice
 2007: Anna Pihl (TV Series)
 2008: CSI:Miami
 2008: Twilight
 2009: Normal
 2009: Nobody
 2009: So You Think You Can Dance(TV Series)
 2010: Waking Madison
 2012: The Vampire Diaries(TV Series)
 2015: Light The Wick
 2016: LA Boys
 2017: Peelers
 2018: Deception(TV Series)

Film Score 
 2001: Stacy Ann Chin
 2003: Urge
 2005: My Beirut
 2008: Diplomacy – the responsibility to protect
 2009: All Boys
 2010: Tankograd
 2013: The War Campaign
 2016: Follow the Money (Danish TV series)
 2018: Human Shelter
 2019: Photographer Of War

References

External links
 Officiel hjemmeside
 Blue Foundation discogs.com
 tobias Wilner discogs.com
 Bichi discogs.com
 Ghost Society discogs.com

Living people
English-language singers from Denmark
21st-century Danish  male singers
Year of birth missing (living people)